Bilpahari is a census town in the Pandabeswar CD block in the Durgapur subdivision of the Paschim Bardhaman district in the state of West Bengal, India.

Geography

Location
Mahal, Baidyanathpur, Dalurband, Ramnagar, Bilpahari and Kendra Khottamdi form a cluster of census towns in the northern portion of Pandabeswar CD block.

Urbanisation
According to the 2011 census, 79.22% of the population of the Durgapur subdivision was urban and 20.78% was rural. The Durgapur subdivision has 1 municipal corporation at Durgapur and 38 (+1 partly) census towns (partly presented in the map alongside; all places marked on the map are linked in the full-screen map).

Demographics
According to the 2011 Census of India, Bilpahari had a total population of 8,565, of which 4,519 (53%) were males and 4,046 (47%) were females. Population in the age range 0–6 years was 1,038. The total number of literate persons in Bilpahari was 5,623 (74.70% of the population over 6 years).

*For language details see Pandabeswar (community development block)#Language and religion

 India census, Bilpahari had a population of 7,786. Males constitute 55% of the population and females 45%. Bilpahari has an average literacy rate of 53%, lower than the national average of 59.5%; with male literacy of 62% and female literacy of 42%. 15% of the population is under 6 years of age.

Infrastructure

According to the District Census Handbook 2011, Bardhaman, Bilpahari covered an area of 4.08 km2. Among the civic amenities, the protected water-supply involved service reservoir, tap water from treated sources, uncovered wells. It had 740 domestic electric connections. Among the educational facilities it had were 5 primary schools, the nearest senior secondary school, at Kendra 3 km away. Among the important commodities it produced were paddy, coal, earthen pots.

Economy
Collieries in the Pandaveswar Area of Eastern Coalfields are: Madaipur, Maderboni, Nutandanga, Pandaveswar, Dalurbandh, Kendra, Samla, South Samla, Khottadih, Kankartala, Dalurbandh OCP, Palasthali OCP and Gangaramchak OCP.

Education
Bilpahari has one primary school.

References

Cities and towns in Paschim Bardhaman district